Gehra Daag is a 1963 Indian Hindi-language romantic crime drama film directed by O. P. Ralhan. A moderate box-office success, the film became the ninth highest earning film of 1963, earning an approximate gross of Rs.1,40,00,000 and a net of Rs.70,00,000. The film stars Rajendra Kumar, Mala Sinha, Lalita Pawar, Usha Kiron, Madan Puri and Manmohan Krishna.

Plot
 
Shanker, kills a fellow mate to protect his sister's honour. He spends his next ten years in prison for that which his family hides and tells everyone that he is in Africa. After his sentence he meets Shobha  due to exchange of parcels in a shop, Later he meets Shobha and her mother whom he saves from drowning due an accidental fall from the ship, she now treats Shankar as a son. He returns and meets Usha and grown up sister Asha. Usha is married to Ramesh and has two children, Asha's marriage is broken when Shankar's imprisonment is revealed. He is saved from committing suicide by Shobha, who loves him and takes him along, Shobha's mother approves of their marriage. When the truth is revealed that the fellow mate he killed accidentally was actually Shobha's brother, Shankar confesses the truth to Shobha's mother, who rebukes him for killing her son. But the jailer convinces her to forgive Shankar as he has repented for all the years spent in jail. Again Shankar goes to commit suicide, but in turn saves Shobha from drowning, finally the mother forgives him for not losing another son. The jailer assures his son's marriage to his sister Asha.

Cast
Rajendra Kumar as Shankar
Mala Sinha as Shobha
Mumtaz as Asha
Madan Puri as Ramesh
Usha Kiran as Usha
Manmohan Krishna as Jailor
Lalita Pawar as Shobha's Mother
Ram Mohan as Shobha's Brother 
Ragini as Dancer / Singer

Music
The film's music was composed by Ravi and the lyrics were penned by Shakeel Badayuni.

References

External links
 

1963 films
1960s Hindi-language films
1963 crime drama films
Films scored by Ravi
Indian crime drama films
Romantic crime films